Veen v R (No 2) is a decision of the High Court of Australia.

The case is a notable decision in Australian Criminal Law, as it is an authority for the principles that apply when a sentence is imposed by a court.

It is the High Court's 25th most cited case.

Facts

Background prior to matter 
Bobby Veen, an Aboriginal Australian man, was a sex worker. In 1971 at the age of 16, he was apprehended by police in Sydney's Hyde Park. He was taken to Darlinghurst Police Station where he stabbed himself. No charges were laid. Later that year he stabbed his landlady four times after a bout of drinking. He appeared before the Children's court and was convicted of malicious wounding, and was committed to an institution.

In 1975 the applicant, then aged 20; stabbed to death a man who had refused to pay him for sexual services. The two had been drinking heavily, and the man had racially abused Veen for being Aboriginal when he requested payment.

Veen was charged with murder but convicted of manslaughter by a jury. This derived from a tacit finding by the jury that Veen was suffering from 'such abnormality of mind ... as substantially impaired his mental responsibility'. Rath J the trial judge sentenced Veen to life imprisonment. This was then overturned on a successful appeal to the High Court, which instead imposed a sentence of 12 years. Veen was granted a parole release on 20 January 1983.

Veen No 2 offence 
On 27 October 1983 Veen killed Paul Edmund Hoson, whom he had stabbed repeatedly with a bread knife. Hoson had invited Veen to his flat for sex. Veen was again charged with murder but the Crown accepted a plea of guilty to manslaughter, again on the grounds of diminished responsibility. Evidence was led at the sentencing hearing about Veen's personal circumstances. Veen had been raised by foster parents, and had a disturbed childhood. He was removed from his foster parents care, and was sexually abused by a male teacher at his school. He performed poorly academically, and had brain damage due to excessively drinking alcohol.

Despite accepting these submissions, the trial judge Justice Hunt sentenced Veen to life imprisonment. After noting the similarities between Veen's killing of Hoson and his prior manslaughter conviction, Hunt J wrote:'I am satisfied that the prisoner is potentially or indeed, certainly – a continuing danger to society when released, in that he is likely to kill again or to inflict serious injury upon his release by reason of his brain damage should he be under the influence of alcohol and find himself in any situation of stress. I therefore feel unable to mitigate the severity of a life sentence by reason of the prisoner's abnormal mental condition.'Veen's appeal to the Court of Appeal failed. He then applied for special leave at the High Court. Leave wasn't granted, instead the special leave application was deferred to coincide with the full hearing.

Judgment 
The majority held for the crown, dismissing Veen's appeal. After discussing the facts of the case, the majority elaborated upon sentencing principles.

The purposes of sentencing were discussed by the majority, in a passage that has since been cited many times: '... sentencing is not a purely logical exercise, and the troublesome nature of the sentencing discretion arises in large measure from unavoidable difficulty in giving weight to each of the purposes of punishment. The purposes of criminal punishment are various: protection of society, deterrence of the offender and of others who might be tempted to offend, retribution and reform. The purposes overlap and none of them can be considered in isolation from the others when determining what is an appropriate sentence in a particular case. They are guideposts to the appropriate sentence but sometimes they point in different directions.'

Aftermath 
Veen was released from prison on compassionate grounds in 2015, after being diagnosed with cancer. He was eligible for parole in 2003, but was refused because 'No one wanted to be the one responsible for Bobby Veen, releasing him back into society and then having it happen for a third time'. In prison, he sought solace in art and classical music, and found an opportunity to reconnect with his indigenous family and heritage.

Significance 
The purposes behind sentencing as mentioned in Veen is relevant to all sentencing decisions that draw upon the common law in Australia. The Veen principles have been codified in some states, such as in the NSW Crimes (Sentencing Procedure) Act 1986

References 

High Court of Australia cases
Australian case law